Jerry Bob Abbott (born April 8, 1942) is an American country music songwriter and record producer. He is the father of heavy metal musicians Dimebag Darrell and Vinnie Paul, both of Pantera and Damageplan.

Biography
Jerry Abbott was born in Abilene, Texas, on April 8, 1942. He began playing the piano at age eight, and took up the guitar aged 15. He joined a local band at the age of 18 and spent a few years touring Texas, then began working as a member of resident bands in numerous nightclubs. During this time, he attended college and obtained a business degree. In 1973, Abbott was hired as a sound engineer by the owner of a local recording studio.

Abbott was married to Norma Carolyn Abbott ( Adkisson) from 1962 until their divorce in 1979, and the marriage produced two sons: Vincent Paul (1964-2018) and Darrell Lance (1966-2004). His sons co-founded the heavy metal band Pantera in 1981, and Abbott was the band's first manager. He also produced the group's early albums Metal Magic (1983), Projects in the Jungle (1984), I Am the Night (1985) and Power Metal (1988), at his recording studio Pantego Sound. All of these albums were released by Metal Magic Records, a label that Abbott had created under the alias Jerry Eld'n.

After Pantera agreed to a major-label deal with Atco Records in 1989, Abbott left his role as the band's producer, though Cowboys from Hell (1990) and Vulgar Display of Power (1992) were both recorded at Pantego Sound. In Texas, Abbott also served as a producer for Texas blues artist Bugs Henderson. Abbott then moved to Nashville to become a country songwriter, and founded a new studio, Abtrax Recording. Far Beyond Driven (1994) was recorded at Abtrax. Abbott was successful as a songwriter and received songwriting credits for songs recorded by artists such as Emmylou Harris and Freddy Fender.

Abbott's former wife Carolyn died from lung cancer in 1999. His younger son Darrell was murdered in 2004 and his elder son Vincent died from a heart attack in 2018. All three are buried at the Moore Memorial Gardens cemetery in Arlington, Texas.

References

External links 
 

1942 births
Living people
American country songwriters
Pantera
People from Abilene, Texas
People from Tarrant County, Texas
Record producers from Texas
Songwriters from Texas
Country musicians from Texas